Muller's Department Store was a major department store, and it is the name of a three-story brick building now located at 625 Ryan Street in downtown Lake Charles, Louisiana.  The building was built in 1913 and opened as a  store.  It was expanded to the rear in 1949, adding about a third.

The building was listed on the National Register of Historic Places in 2007.  Its boundaries were increased in the same year to include the nearby Berdon-Campbell Store at 619 Ryan Street, which was acquired by Muller's Department Store in February 1943.

At the time of its NRHP application, plans were underway for it to be renovated into apartments.  The developer sought tax credits that would be tied to NRHP listing.

Today it serves as an apartment complex in the heart of downtown.

See also 
National Register of Historic Places listings in Calcasieu Parish, Louisiana
Lake Charles, Louisiana

References

Commercial buildings on the National Register of Historic Places in Louisiana
Buildings and structures in Lake Charles, Louisiana
National Register of Historic Places in Calcasieu Parish, Louisiana
Defunct department stores based in Louisiana